Georgica may refer to:
Georgics, a poem in four books by Virgil
Georgica curiosa (de), a 17th-century agricultural encyclopedia in German, compiled by Wolf Helmhardt von Hohberg
Georgica (film), a 1998 Estonian film directed by Sulev Keedus
Georgica Pond, a coastal lagoon in New York, United States
Georgica (journal), an academic journal specialized in the Kartvelian studies
A British tenpin bowling company, reconstituted in 2009 as Essenden plc.
A nightclub on Wainscott Stone Road in East Hampton, New York